Lionel Cohen may refer to:

 Lionel Cohen, Baron Cohen (1888–1973), British judge
 Lionel I. Cohen (1914–2009), changed to Lionel Casson, American classicist 
 Lionel Louis Cohen (1832–1887), English financier, politician, and communal worker